Charles Manley Brown Jr. (November 20, 1902 – 19 May 1995) was a long-time U.S. politician in Atlanta, sometimes called Charlie Brown.

Biography
Charlie Brown was born in Birmingham, Alabama, the third child and second son of storekeeper Charles Manley Brown Sr., and Mamie Susan "Sook" Fickett Brown. His father died in 1904, five months before the birth of their fifth child. Charles Sr.'s father, Henry Hart Brown, had been a journalist, lawyer, and politician, serving several terms in the Alabama state legislature and one term as sheriff.

A graduate of Georgia Tech, Brown was a commissioner of Fulton County, Georgia (where Atlanta is the county seat) from 1941 to 1948, and from 1966 to 1979. He served as chairman of the commission from 1945 to 1947 and 1976 to 1978, and at other times during 1966, 1968, 1971, and 1974. He also served as a state senator from Fulton County in the Georgia General Assembly from 1957 to 1964, and retired from politics in 1979. He had also run for mayor of Atlanta three times.

He also served on the Fulton-DeKalb Hospital Authority which oversees Grady Memorial Hospital. He was also involved in many other programs, including starting both MARTA and Atlanta–Fulton County Stadium. He was also involved in the creation of the Fulton County Airport at west Atlanta, which was named Charlie Brown Field in his honor.

Personal life
Brown married Elise Anderson. They had two daughters.

References

1902 births
1995 deaths
Georgia Tech alumni
Fulton County commissioners
20th-century American politicians